The following is a list of Nippon Professional Baseball players with the last name starting with U, retired or active.

U

References

External links
Japanese Baseball

 U